Neocollyris orichalcina is a species of ground beetle in the genus Neocollyris in the family Carabidae. It was described by Horn in 1896.

References

Orichalcina, Neocollyris
Beetles described in 1896